Viburnum grandiflorum, variously called the cranberry bush, flowering viburnum, grand viburnum, and Himalayan viburnum, is a species of flowering plant in the family Viburnaceae, native to the Himalayan region. It grows in open forests. A sparse shrub or gnarled tree reaching , it has showy pink flowers larger than the typical viburnum, and red to black fruit, which are edible. It is hardy to USDA zone 6a. The unimproved species is available from commercial suppliers, as is a putative form, Viburnum grandiflorum f.foetens, the stinking Himalayan viburnum, and a number of cultivars, including 'DeOirsprong', 'Desmond Clarke', and 'Snow White'.

References

grandiflorum
Flora of Pakistan
Flora of East Himalaya
Flora of Nepal
Flora of West Himalaya
Flora of Tibet
Flora of Assam (region)
Plants described in 1830